The concept of gravitational focusing describes how the gravitational attraction between two particles increases the probability that they will collide. Without gravitational force, the likelihood of a collision would depend on the cross-sectional area of the two particles. However, the presence of gravity can cause particles that would have otherwise missed each other to be drawn together, effectively increasing the size of their cross-sectional area.

Function 
Gravitational focusing applies to extended objects like the Moon, planets and the Sun, whose interior density distributions are well known. Gravitational focusing is responsible for the power-law mass function of star clusters. Gravitational focusing plays a significant role in the formation of planets, as it shortens the time required for them to form and promotes the growth of larger particles.

Dark matter 
Gravitational focusing typically only has a small impact on the relaxed halo dark matter component, with effects typically remaining at around the 5% level. However, the impact of gravitational focusing on dark matter substructures could potentially be much greater.

References 

Gravity